These are the Billboard magazine Hot 100 number one hits of 1975. Both 1974 and 1975 hold the Hot 100 record for the year with the most No. 1 hits with 35 songs reaching the No. 1 spot. Additionally, the period beginning January 11 and ending April 12 constitutes the longest run of a different No. 1 song every week (14 weeks) in Billboard history. Coincidentally, it both begins and ends with songs by Elton John. The longest running number one song of 1975 is "Love Will Keep Us Together" by Captain & Tennille.

That year, 18 acts earned their first number one song, such as Barry Manilow, Ohio Players, Linda Ronstadt, Average White Band, The Eagles, The Doobie Brothers, Labelle, Minnie Riperton, Earth, Wind & Fire, Freddy Fender, Captain & Tennille, Van McCoy, Hamilton, Joe Frank & Reynolds, KC and the Sunshine Band, Glen Campbell, David Bowie, and Silver Convention. Frankie Valli, having already hit number one with The Four Seasons, also earns his first number one song as a solo act. Elton John, Neil Sedaka, The Eagles, John Denver, and KC and the Sunshine Band were the only acts to have more than one number one song, with Elton John having three, and the others with two.

Chart history

Number-one artists

See also
1975 in music
List of Cash Box Top 100 number-one singles of 1975

References

Sources
Fred Bronson's Billboard Book of Number 1 Hits, 5th Edition
Joel Whitburn's Top Pop Singles 1955-2008, 12 Edition
Joel Whitburn Presents the Billboard Hot 100 Charts: The Seventies
Additional information obtained can be verified within Billboard's online archive services and print editions of the magazine.

United States Hot 100
1975